Thomas Sayers Ellis (born Washington, D.C.) is an American poet, photographer and band leader. He previously taught as an associate professor at Case Western Reserve University in Cleveland, Bennington College in Vermont, and also at Sarah Lawrence College until 2012.

Life
He was raised in Washington, D.C. and attended Paul Laurence Dunbar High School. In 1988 he co-founded the Dark Room Collective in Cambridge, Massachusetts, an organization that celebrated and gave greater visibility to emerging and established writers of color. He is the leader and a founding member of the band Heroes are Gang Leaders. Ellis received his M.F.A. from Brown University in 1995.

Ellis is known in the poetry community as a literary activist and innovator, whose poems "resist limitations and rigorously embrace wholeness." His poems have appeared in magazines such as AGNI Callaloo, Grand Street, Harvard Review, Tin House, Columbia: A Journal of Literature and Art, and anthologized in The Best American Poetry (1997, 2001, and 2010) and in Take Three: AGNI New Poets Series (Graywolf Press, 1996), an anthology series featuring the work of three emerging poets in each volume. He has received fellowships and grants from the Fine Arts Work Center, the Ohio Arts Council, the Bread Loaf Writers' Conference, Yaddo, and the MacDowell Colony.

Ellis is a contributing editor to Callaloo. He compiled and edited Quotes Community: Notes for Black Poets (University of Michigan Press, Poets on Poetry Series).

His first full-length collection, The Maverick Room, was published by Graywolf Press and won the John C. Zacharis First Book Award from Ploughshares.

The book takes as its subject the social, geographical and historical neighborhoods of Washington, D.C., bringing different tones of voice to bear on the various quadrants of the city.

He is also the author of a chapbook, The Genuine Negro Hero (Kent State University Press, 2001), and the chaplet Song On (Wintered Press 2005).

Awards 
 2005: Whiting Award
 2006 John C. Zacharis First Book Award
 2015: Guggenheim Fellowship for poetry

Works 
The corny toys. Arrowsmith Press. 2018. .

Anthologies

References

External links

 BlueFlower Arts > Author's Booking Agent > Author Page
 Ploughshares > Authors & Articles > Postscripts: Zacharis Award Winner Thomas Sayers Ellis > by Don Lee Winter 2006 -07 Issue
 Publishers Weekly: 'Identity Repair Poet: PW Talks with Thomas Sayers Ellis' (2010)
 Audio: MoMA: Multimedia: Thomas Sayers Ellis: The New Perform-A-Form (2008)
 Poetry Foundation > Poet > Thomas Sayers Ellis
 Audio: WAMU - 88.5 FM - American University Radio > Interview with Thomas Sayers Ellis > Sept. 21, 2004
 Audio Interview: WCPN Radio (NPR) > Thomas Sayers Ellis
 Poets & Writers News & Trends > Q&A: Eady Sees Cave Canem Success > By Thomas Sayers Ellis > Nov/Dec 2006

Artists from Washington, D.C.
American male poets
American photographers
Sarah Lawrence College faculty
Case Western Reserve University faculty
Brown University alumni
Living people
Year of birth missing (living people)
Dunbar High School (Washington, D.C.) alumni